Eoophyla ochripicta is a moth in the family Crambidae. It was described by Frederic Moore in 1888. It is found in India.

References

Eoophyla
Moths described in 1888